Basilashvili is a Georgian surname. Notable people with the surname include:

 Oleg Basilashvili (born 1934), Soviet/Russian film and theatre actor
 Nikoloz Basilashvili (born 1992), Georgian tennis player

Georgian-language surnames